Tin Gods is a 1932 British drama film directed by F.W. Kraemer and starring Frank Cellier, Dorothy Bartlam and Evan Thomas. It was made at Welwyn Studios as a second feature by British International Pictures.

Cast
 Frank Cellier as Major Drake  
 Dorothy Bartlam as Daphne Drake  
 Evan Thomas as Robert Staveley  
 Frank Royde as Cheng Chi Lung  
 Ben Welden as Cyrus P. Schroeder  
 Alexander Field as Lane  
 Margaret Damer as Mrs. Drake  
 Ruth Maitland as Mrs. Schroeder  
 Atholl Fleming as Padre 
 Hal Gordon

References

Bibliography
 Low, Rachael. Filmmaking in 1930s Britain. George Allen & Unwin, 1985.
 Wood, Linda. British Films, 1927-1939. British Film Institute, 1986.

External links

1932 films
British drama films
1932 drama films
Films shot at Welwyn Studios
Quota quickies
British black-and-white films
1930s English-language films
1930s British films